Virginia's 12th House of Delegates district elects one of the hundred Delegates of the Virginia House of Delegates, United States. Located in southwestern Virginia, 12th district represents the city of Radford, Giles County, and portions of Montgomery County and Pulaski County. The seat is currently held by Republican Jason Ballard, first elected during the 2021 election.

Electoral history

2017 
Hurst was elected in 2017 as part of a wave of new Democrats in the House of Delegates. He earned 54.3% of the vote, defeating three-term Republican incumbent Joseph R. Yost.

District officeholders

References

012
Radford, Virginia
Giles County, Virginia
Montgomery County, Virginia
Pulaski County, Virginia